Albert Cecil Scaddan (4 December 1887 – 21 May 1967) was an Australian rules footballer who played for the Carlton Football Club in the Victorian Football League (VFL).

Notes

External links 
		
Albert Scaddan's profile at Blueseum

1887 births
Carlton Football Club players
South Bendigo Football Club players
Australian rules footballers from Bendigo
1967 deaths